George Hobson (28 June 1903 – 29 December 1993) was an English amateur footballer who played for professional clubs. He was capped by the England Amateur team.

Career
Hobson played for Bishop Auckland, Huddersfield Town (with which he won Central League titles in 1924–25 and 1925–26), Bradford City, Dulwich Hamlet. He later captained Yorkshire Amateur and toured the Baltic states of Lithuania, Latvia and Estonia with them. He had many offers to turn professional from first division clubs but preferred to keep his amateur status due to commitments with his motor business on Albion Street in Leeds. In 1931 he won two caps for England Amateur, playing against Wales and Scotland.

His brother-in-law was jockey and trainer Harry Wragg.

References

1903 births
1993 deaths
English footballers
Footballers from Leeds
Association football defenders
English Football League players
Bishop Auckland F.C. players
Huddersfield Town A.F.C. players
Bradford City A.F.C. players
Dulwich Hamlet F.C. players
Yorkshire Amateur A.F.C. players